This is a list of members elected to the tenth Parliament of Uganda (2016 to 2021) in the 2016 general election. It was preceded by the ninth Parliament (2011 to 2016) and succeeded by the eleventh Parliament (starting 2021).

Leadership 
The acting Chief Justice of the Supreme Court of Uganda Steven Kavuma presided over the election of the Speaker of the Tenth Parliament of Uganda, which Rebecca Alitwala Kadaga won, making her the tenth Speaker of the Tenth Parliament of Uganda. She then oversaw the election of the Deputy Speaker of the 10th Parliament of Uganda. Muhammad Nsereko and Jacob Oulanya both ran, and Oulanya won 300 votes to 115 votes, with President Yoweri Museveni in attendance.

Composition

List of members

References 
 
 
 
 
 
 

Parliament of Uganda
Lists of political office-holders in Uganda